Konstantin Päts' second cabinet was in office in Estonia from 2 August 1923 to 26 March 1924, when it was succeeded by Friedrich Akel's cabinet.

Members

This cabinet's members were the following:

References

Cabinets of Estonia